The 2018 OFC Champions League was the 17th edition of the Oceanian Club Championship, Oceania's premier club football tournament organized by the Oceania Football Confederation (OFC) and the 12th season under the current OFC Champions League name.

In the final, Team Wellington defeated Lautoka 10–3 on aggregate and qualified as the OFC representative at the 2018 FIFA Club World Cup in the United Arab Emirates. Auckland City are the defending champions, having won the last seven titles straight, but they were eliminated in the semi-finals.

Format change
For this season, the top two teams of each group (instead of only the group winners) in the group stage advanced to the knockout stage, which included a quarter-final round played as a single match hosted by the group winners.

Teams

A total of 18 teams from all 11 OFC member associations enter the competition.
The seven developed associations (Fiji, New Caledonia, New Zealand, Papua New Guinea, Solomon Islands, Tahiti, Vanuatu) are awarded two berths each in the group stage.
The four developing associations (American Samoa, Cook Islands, Samoa, Tonga) are awarded one berth each in the qualifying stage, with the winners and runners-up advancing to the group stage.

Schedule
The schedule of the competition is as follows.

Qualifying stage

Group stage

Group A

Group B

Group C

Group D

Knockout stage

Bracket

Quarter-finals

Semi-finals

Final

Top goalscorers

Awards
The following awards were given at the conclusion of the tournament.

See also
2018 FIFA Club World Cup

References

External links
OFC Champions League 2018, oceaniafootball.com
News > 2018 OFC Champions League, oceaniafootball.com

 
2018
1